Paul Meliande (born 20 December 2001) is a French professional footballer who plays as a winger for Pau FC.

Career
He began his senior career with their reserves in 2019. On 20 August 2020, he signed his first professional contract with the club keeping him for 3 years. He made his professional debut with Pau in a 3–0 Ligue 2 loss to Valenciennes FC on 22 August 2020.

References

External links
 

2001 births
Living people
People from Orthez
French footballers
Association football wingers
Pau FC players
Ligue 2 players
Championnat National 3 players
Sportspeople from Pyrénées-Atlantiques
Footballers from Nouvelle-Aquitaine